The Woelke-Stoffel House is a two-story Queen Anne style home built in 1896, in Anaheim, Orange County, in Southern California. It was constructed by architects George Franklin Barber and Armstrong Davis Porter. The home is now owned by the City of Anaheim and part of Founders Park, in which sits a collection of historical buildings and acts as a museum. Free public tours are available on the 3rd Saturday of every month. Its location with close proximity to the Disneyland Resort makes it a popular tourist destination in the area. It was listed on the National Register of Historic Places on July 8, 2013. The house is in the Anaheim Founders' Park. Founders' Park also has the Pioneer House of the Mother Colony house built by the city's founder George Hanson . At the park is also a city landmark 1876 Moreton Bay Fig tree, a large Carriage House in Queen Anne style, vegetable garden, small orange grove, a Pump House and windmill.

References

Historic houses
Historic houses articles
History of Anaheim, California
Tourist attractions in Anaheim, California
Buildings and structures in Anaheim, California
Houses completed in 1896
1896 establishments in California